Nate DiMeo is an American podcaster, screenwriter, and author based out of Los Angeles, and the host of his award-winning podcast, The Memory Palace. He is also the author (although the fictional character Leslie Knope is listed as the author on the book's cover) of Pawnee: the Greatest Town in America and a finalist for the 2012 Thurber Prize for American Humor. After spending a decade on public radio, featured on programs ranging from NPR's All Things Considered and Morning Edition, to Marketplace, DiMeo decided to found his own his podcast centered around lesser-known historical narratives. Since 2008, The Memory Palace has been received with critical acclaim and was nominated for a Peabody Award in 2016, and was profiled in The New Yorker in 2018.

Personal
Nate DiMeo was born in 1974 in Providence, Rhode Island. His parents were teachers. After his birth, the family moved to Rehoboth, Massachusetts, where he was raised. After college, he worked in and around Providence, eventually finding a way to work in public radio. He moved to Los Angeles when an opportunity arose to become an editor on the NPR production, "Marketplace". He branched out from there, both into reporting for the network and also into screenwriting for various television shows (including episodes of Parks and Recreation and The Astronaut Wives Club). He began producing short history-based audio vignettes on the side, mostly for his own growth and enjoyment at first. The first episode of what became The Memory Palace aired in November 2008, and the show became sufficiently popular (and financially viable) that DiMeo has gradually withdrawn from his other interests to spend full time on TMP as an independent vehicle (not on NPR; presently carried by Radiotopia).

In 2016-7, the Metropolitan Museum of Art named him artist-in-residence, and he produced several TMP episodes highlighting aspects and properties of the Museum.

DiMeo is married to television writer/producer Leila Gerstein. They live in Los Angeles.

References

Living people
American podcasters
American screenwriters
Year of birth missing (living people)